The Taichung World Flora Exposition is an AIPH (category A2|B1) horticultural exposition held between 3 November 2018 and 24 April 2019 in Houli District, Taiwan. There were 33 participating countries.

Theme and locations
The festival had three themes and three locations. Green held at Waipu Park Area, Nature at Houli Horse Ranch  and People at Fengyuan's Ruanpizai Creek.

After the expo the Waipu park Area will be transformed into an international agriculture centre, and will host the 2020 World Orchid Conference.

Participating countries
In addition to the hosts Taiwan, the following countries participated: 
Bhutan,
Canada,
Chile,
China Hong Kong,
France,
Germany,
Japan,
Kazakhstan,
Korea,
Madagascar,
Malaysia,
Mongolia,
Myanmar,
Nepal,
the Netherlands,
Oman,
Pakistan,
Singapore,
Somalia,
Turkey,
UK and 
USA. With the Marshall Islands, Palau and the Solomon Islands banding together to present the Asia-Pacific Diplomatic Joint Garden.

Pavilions
The Myanmar pavilion was designed by Levi Sap Nei Thang. She used her logo ”I Love Myanmar” a heart-shaped in the national flag of Myanmar. Myanmar participated in both indoor flower show and world garden.

The Netherlands pavilion was designed by MAYU architects.

The tallest bamboo building in Taiwan was designed by ZUO studio and used as the Bamboo pavilion, and was made of Taiwan native bamboo species (including Moso and Makino Bamboo).

Mascots
The fair's mascots were a family of anthropomorphised leopard cats and their bee-keeping horse neighbour called Horsiver.

References

Notes

2018 in Taiwan
2019 in Taiwan
Horticultural exhibitions
Taichung
World's fairs in Taiwan
Garden festivals in Taiwan